Fyodor Dmitrievich Berezin (born February 7, 1960) is a Russian science fiction writer. He has published 3 novel series, and 2 separate works, scoring him awards at the International Science Fiction Festival.

Since 2014 he has been an active supporter of the Donetsk People's Republic, where he was Deputy Minister of Defense in 2014. He is included in sanctions lists in European Union countries and Ukraine, among others.

Biography
Fyodor Berezin was born in Donetsk. He lived there until 1977 when he entered the Engels anti-aircraft training school. He graduated in 1981 and served as an AA officer first in Kazakhstan and then in the Far East.

In 1991, Berezin left the military at the rank of captain and currently lives in his hometown of Donetsk. He has worked as an entrepreneur and tried a multitude of different career fields such as mine construction. Married, he has a son and a daughter.

Berezin has been a professional writer since 1998. He is also the founder and chairman of "Strannik", the Donetsk science fiction club.

Berezin's novels work within the boundaries of hard science fiction and are labeled by some critics as "turborealist". He calls his style of writing "science-fictional/philosophical technothriller". Berezin published his first novel, the science-fiction novel Ash, in 2001. He recognizes the influence of H. G. Wells, Kurt Vonnegut, Stanislaw Lem and Arkady and Boris Strugatsky in his work.

War in Donbas
During the War in Donbas, he served as the Deputy Minister of Defense of the pro-Russian separatist organisation of the Donetsk People's Republic (DPR) for a period in 2014. In November 2014, he led an armed seizure of the Donetsk branch of the Writer's Union of Ukraine, declaring the establishment of a new union of writers of the DPR.

Novels
 Separate works:
 Ash
 The Lunar Option
 Series:
 The Black Ship
 The Huge Black Ship
 The Crew of the Black Ship
 The Creator of the Black Ship
 Red Stars
 Incoming Cataclysm
 Parallel Cataclysm
 War 2030
 Red Dawn
 Metropolis on Fire
 Attack on the Rocky Mountains

Awards
 1st place – Golden Caduceus – International Science Fiction Festival "the Golden Bridge" in Kharkiv; nominated for the "Best Debut" award for the novel Ash (2001).
 2nd place – Silver Caduceus – nominated for the "Series and Novels with Sequels" award for the novels Incoming Cataclysm and Parallel Cataclysm (2002).
 3rd place – Bronze Caduceus – nominated for the "Series and Novels with Sequels" award for the novels War 2030: Red Dawn and War 2030: Metropolis on Fire (2005).
 3rd place – Bronze Caduceus – nominated for the "Series and Novels with Sequels" award for the novel War 2030: Attack on the Rocky Mountains.

External links
 Interview in 2005(Russian)
 Letter from Fyodor Berezin to Maxim Kalashnikov (Russian)

References 

1960 births
Living people
Writers from Donetsk
Russian science fiction writers
Soviet Army officers
People of the Donetsk People's Republic
Pro-Russian people of the 2014 pro-Russian unrest in Ukraine
Pro-Russian people of the war in Donbas
Russian individuals subject to the U.S. Department of the Treasury sanctions
Russian individuals subject to European Union sanctions
Ukrainian collaborators with Russia